Daniel Meyer Darragh (born November 28, 1946) is a former American football player.  He played college football at William & Mary. A quarterback, he played professionally in the American Football League for the Buffalo Bills from 1968 through 1969, and for the NFL Bills in 1970.  He shared the starting job with Ed Rutkowski, Kay Stephenson and Tom Flores in 1968 while long-time starter and former AFL MVP Jack Kemp was out with an injury.  He is now a practicing attorney in Pittsburgh.

College career
Dan Darragh played college football for William & Mary. Ironically, his head coach was Marv Levy, the man who'd lead the Buffalo Bills to four straight Super Bowls. In 1965, Darragh plated in 10 games for William & Mary, passing for 8 touchdown passes, 896 yards and 7 interceptions, and two rushing touchdowns. The Tribe finished with a 6-4 record overall, 5-1 in the Southern Conference. The next season, the Tribe's record slip to 5-4-1 overall, 4-1-1 in conference. The Tribe became more a pass first offense, with Darragh throwing the ball for 1,346 yards, first time he'd eclipsed the 1,000 yard passing mark in his career. In Darragh's senior season, William & Mary continued to struggle, but on November, 11th, 1967, they played West Virginia to a 16-16 tie, handing the Mountaineers the only blemish on their conference record.

Pro career
In 1968, the Bills selected Darragh in the 13th round of the NFL draft. The Bills starter the previous season, Jack Kemp was slated to miss the entire 1968 season. The Bills had hold overs Tom Flores, Ed Rutkowski and the nearly acquired Kay Stephenson at quarterback. Darragh won the starting position out of training camp. The season started with a 16-7 home loss against the Boston Patriots. The Bills then dropped their next two games to Oakland Raiders and Cincinnati Bengals before a 37-35 home win over the New York Jets. The highlight of the game was Bills defensive back Tom Janik picking off a Joe Namath pass and returning it 100 yards for a touchdown. As for Darragh, he only completed eight passes and threw an interception, but he had his first win in the pros as a starting quarterback. It would be the only win for the Bills that season, as they finished 1-12-1. for the season.

Jack Kemp returned for the 1969 season, and Darragh was exiled to the role of back-up. Under new head coach John Rauch, the Bills improved to 4-10. Darragh played in three games, starting in two of them as the season drew to a close. The Bills lost both of Darragh's starts that season, first to the Kansas City Chiefs and then to the Jets. Darragh suffered a season ending separated right shoulder against the Jets.  In the 1970 draft, the Bills selected Dennis Shaw out of San Diego State as their quarterback of the future. Jack Kemp had since decided to retire from pro football. Darragh also had more competition for the quarterback position, James Harris, who was one of the first African-American quarterbacks to play in the modern era. While Shaw was assigned to hold a clipboard for the first few weeks as Darragh started. The Bills lost both games, to the Denver Broncos and Los Angeles Rams respectively. His last appearance in an NFL game would occur on October 11, 1970, appearing in a relief role in the Bills 23-10 loss to the Pittsburgh Steelers. Darragh was released by the Bills at the end of training camp in 1971, ending his NFL career. Darragh finished with a 1-10 record as a starting quarterback.

In 1992, William & Mary inducted Darragh into the school's Hall of Fame.

See also
 List of American Football League players

References

1946 births
Living people
American football quarterbacks
Buffalo Bills players
William & Mary Tribe football players
Players of American football from Pittsburgh
American Football League players